Murphyores Inc Pty Ltd v Commonwealth, was a case decided in the High Court of Australia regarding the scope of the trade and commerce power in section 51(i) of the Constitution.

Background

Section 112 of the Customs Act 1901, prohibited the exportation of mineral sands unless authorised by the Minister. Murphyores Inc Pty Ltd, which held leases from the state of Queensland to mine mineral sands on Fraser Island, sought permission from the Minister to export mineral sands. Such authorisation was withheld pending the outcome of an environmental inquiry. Murphyores challenged the constitutional validity of prohibition and sought an injunction to the study, and a declaration that the Minister cannot make a prohibition for environmental purposes.

Decision

In a unanimous decision, the court held the legislation was a valid exercise of the trade and commerce power. Section 51(i) was a non-purposive power, and the only relevant factor was the subject matter of trade and commerce. The motive and purpose behind the legislation was irrelevant.

See also 

 Section 51(i) of the Australian Constitution
 Australian constitutional law

References 

 Winterton, G. et al. Australian federal constitutional law: commentary and materials, 1999. LBC Information Services, Sydney.

High Court of Australia cases
1976 in Australian law
Australian constitutional law
Trade and commerce power in the Australian Constitution cases
1976 in case law